OX4_ The Best of Ride is a compilation album by the British band Ride, released in 2001 by Ignition Records in the United Kingdom. The album was also released as the first disc in the three-disc Ride Box Set, which also included Firing Blanks_ Unreleased Ride Recordings 1988-95 and Live at Reading Festival 1992. The American edition was released by The First Time Records in 2002 and included a second disc with four of the unreleased tracks from Firing Blanks. The title is a reference to the band's local Oxford postcode in their teenage years.

Track listing

 "Chelsea Girl"
 "Drive Blind"
 "Like a Daydream"
 "Taste"
 "Dreams Burn Down"
 "Vapour Trail"
 "Unfamiliar"
 "Leave Them All Behind"
 "Twisterella"
 "OX4"
 "Birdman"
 "From Time to Time"
 "How Does it Feel to Feel"
 "I Don't Know Where it Comes From"
 "Black Nite Crash"

US Edition Bonus Disc:

 "Something's Burning"
 "Tongue Tied"
 "She's So Fine"
 "In a Different Place (Differently)"

References

External links

OX4 The Best of Ride at YouTube (streamed copy where licensed)
The First Time Records website

2001 greatest hits albums
Ride (band) albums
Creation Records compilation albums
Ignition Records albums